Fosdick-Masten Park High School, now known as City Honors School, is a historic public high school building located at Buffalo in Erie County, New York. The school is located on a  site.  It was designed by architects Esenwein & Johnson and is a -story H-shaped brick structure constructed in 1912–1914 and sheathed in white glazed terra cotta tile.

It was added to the National Register of Historic Places in 1983.

Notable alumni
Frankie Pytlak, former Major League Baseball catcher
John Wyatt, former Major League Baseball pitcher
Lucille Clifton, African American writer and poet

In Popular Culture
A cartoon sketch of (then) Masten Park High School appears on the 1938 Goudey baseball card #269 of alumnus Frankie Pytlak.

References

External links 
 From Masten Park High School to City Honors: The Story of a School Site

School buildings on the National Register of Historic Places in New York (state)
Beaux-Arts architecture in New York (state)
School buildings completed in 1912
Education in Buffalo, New York
High schools in Buffalo, New York
1912 establishments in New York (state)
National Register of Historic Places in Buffalo, New York